Walter Fabián Coelho Alves (born 20 January 1977) is a Uruguayan former association footballer who last played for Central Español.

Coelho born in Artigas, near to the Brazil border and farthest city from Uruguayan capital.

Honours

International
 
 1999 Copa América: Runner-up 1999
FIFA U-20 World Cup: Runner-up 1997

External links
Profile at Tenfield

1977 births
Living people
Uruguayan footballers
Uruguayan expatriate footballers
Uruguay international footballers
Uruguay under-20 international footballers
Uruguayan people of Brazilian descent
1997 FIFA Confederations Cup players
1999 Copa América players
Uruguayan Primera División players
Segunda División players
Club Nacional de Football players
Miramar Misiones players
Elche CF players
Central Español players
Expatriate footballers in Spain
Association football midfielders